The Cape Cod School of Art, also known as Hawthorne School of Art, was the first outdoor school of figure painting in America; it was started by Charles Webster Hawthorne in Provincetown, Massachusetts, in 1898.

The Hawthorne Class Studio building off Miller Hill Road is on the List of Nationally Registered Historic Places.

Notable students

References

External links
Several Charles Webster Hawthorne exhibition catalogs from The Metropolitan Museum of Art Libraries (fully available online as PDF)

Art schools in Massachusetts
Education in Barnstable County, Massachusetts
School buildings on the National Register of Historic Places in Massachusetts
Educational institutions established in 1898
Provincetown, Massachusetts
Buildings and structures in Barnstable County, Massachusetts
Arts organizations established in 1898
National Register of Historic Places in Barnstable County, Massachusetts
1898 establishments in Massachusetts